Journal of Agricultural, Biological and Environmental Statistics (JABES) is a peer-reviewed academic journal published by Springer Science+Business Media. It is a joint publication of the International Biometric Society and the American Statistical Association. The journal publishes four issues a year composed of articles that introduce new statistical methods to solve practical problems in the agricultural sciences, the biological sciences, and the environmental sciences.

Abstracting and indexing 
Journal of Agricultural, Biological and Environmental Statistics is abstracted and indexed in the Journal Citation Reports, Mathematical Reviews, Research Papers in Economics, SCImago Journal Rank, Scopus, Science Citation Index, Zentralblatt MATH, among others. According to the Journal Citation Reports, the journal has a 2019 impact factor of 1.650, ranking it 57th out of 93 journals in the category "Biology," 35th out of 59 journals in the category "Mathematical & Computational Biology" and 39th out of 124 journals in the category "Statistics & Probability".

External links

References 

Statistics journals
Publications established in 2001
Springer Science+Business Media academic journals
American Statistical Association academic journals
English-language journals